Tofig Rashid oghlu Yagublu (born 1961), is an Azerbaijani politician, journalist, former deputy chairman of the Musavat Party (2010–2018), and a member of the coordinating center of the National Council of Democratic Forces (NCDF).

Arrested and imprisoned several times, Amnesty International has recognized Yagublu as a prisoner of conscience.

Personal life 
Tofig Rashid oglu Yagublu was born on February 6, 1961, in the Azerbaijani-populated village of Injaoglu (Shua-Bolnisi), then Georgian SSR of the Soviet Union. In 1989, he applied for withdrawal from the membership of the CPSU. He took part in the First Nagorno-Karabakh War, and was twice presented for the title of National Hero of Azerbaijan, but in the end, was not awarded for various reasons. In 2012, the Yeni Musavat online newspaper began publishing Yagublu's war diary.

He is married and has two daughters and a son. In 2012, one of Yagublu's daughters, Nigar Hazi, was imprisoned. His other daughter, Nargiz Yagublu, died in 2015.

Political activity 
Yagublu joined Musavat in 1992. During the presidency of Abulfaz Elchibey, Yagublu was the first deputy head of the executive power of the Binagadi District, Baku.

Arrests 
Yagublu has been arrested several times since 1998 when he was sentenced to two years of suspended imprisonment for participating in protests. On February 4 2013, he was sentenced to five years in prison for participating in the anti-government protests. On March 17, 2016, he was pardoned by a presidential decree. In 2014, the Shaki Court of Grave Crimes sentenced Yagublu to five years in prison, officially for inciting mass violence. In October 2019, Yagublu was detained for 30 days, for disobeying police orders during peaceful protests, according to the official narrative.

Arrest in 2020 
According to the Ministry of Internal Affairs of Azerbaijan, on March 22 2020, at about 15:00 in the Nizami District of Baku, a Toyota Corolla driven by Tofig Yagublu collided with a Lada Riva driven by Elkhan Jabrayilov. However, Yagublu's daughter, Nigar Hazi told that when he was in his parked car, another car drove into him, while Elkhan Jabrailov, who was driving, rushed to Yagublu with claims. 

Nemat Kerimli, one of Yagublu's advocates, claimed that the investigators were biased and explained that the police had "seized Yagublu's mobile phone and wouldn't return it. Yagublu had recorded to his phone how, after the road accident, he was attacked by the man, who was later recognized to be a victim." Nevertheless, head of the press-service of the Ministry of Internal Affairs Ehsan Zahidov said that "even though the accident was caused by Tofig Yagublu, he started a conflict and beat Elkhan Jabrayilov and his wife Javahir Jabrayilova with fists and a wrench, causing them injuries of varying severity." 

The Nizami District Police Office opened a criminal case under Article 221.3 of the Criminal Code of Azerbaijan (Hooliganism, using weapons or items used as weapons if this was accompanied by violence against the victim or destruction or damage to other people's property). Tofig Yagublu was detained as a suspect.

The next day, Tofig Yagublu was remanded in custody for three months and taken to Prison 3. However, he did not accept the criminal case against him and said that he was "slandered". He said that he treated the trial as biased and "fulfilling the political order" of the Azerbaijani leadership. His daughter Nigar Hazi also denied all charges. On May 21, Human Rights Watch urged the Azerbaijani authorities to set Tofig Yagublu free.

On September 1 2020, the public prosecutor spoke at the trial in the Nizami District Court, chaired by Judge Nariman Mehdiyev, and requested that Tofig Yagublu be sentenced to four years and six months in prison. On September 2, Yagublu accused the court and the authorities of fabricating charges, then declared that he will start a hunger strike in protest against this arbitrariness. On September 3 2020, Yagublu was sentenced to four years and three months in prison.

Arrest in 2021 
On 3 December 2021, Azerbaijan police violently dispersed a peaceful protest in central Baku, detaining dozens of protesters, including Yagublu, who alleged that police severely beat him while videoing him and demanded that he say on camera that he would stop criticizing Azerbaijan’s leadership. Human Rights Watch stated that he was beaten in the police station and then again while being driven to the outskirts of Baku, being dumped 70km outside the city center, and that "his face and body showed clear signs of abuse."

On December 15 2021, Amnesty International said that Yagublu was re-arrested, describing arrest as an attack on government critics and basic freedoms in Azerbaijan

International response to imprisonment 
Responding to a question at a briefing on 9 January 2023 about the most recent detention of Yagublu and fellow activist Bakhtiyar Hajiyev, U.S. State Department spokesperson Ned Price said that the Department was "deeply troubled by the arrest and detention of Bakhtiyar Hajiyev and Tofig Yagublu". Price urged the Azerbaijani authorities to "release them expeditiously" and "respect its citizens’ right, including the rights to express views peacefully."

References

External links 

1961 births
People from Kvemo Kartli
Musavat politicians
Azerbaijani politicians convicted of crimes
21st-century Azerbaijani politicians
Azerbaijani journalists
Azerbaijani military personnel of the Nagorno-Karabakh War
Resigned Communist Party of the Soviet Union members
Living people
Political controversies in Azerbaijan